James W. Parkinson (born 1949) is a California lawyer and author, an activist for reparations to be paid to Americans who were slave laborers for private Japanese companies during World War II.

Parkinson was born in New Orleans, Louisiana.  He received his bachelor's degree in law from Brigham Young University in 1973.

Parkinson authored with Lee Benson Soldier Slaves: Abandoned by the White House, Courts and Congress and more recently was the producer of the film The Inheritance of War also about the Americans held prisoner of war by Japan and their quest for reparations.

Parkinson is also a 1976 graduate of the J. Reuben Clark Law School at Brigham Young University and is admitted to practice law in California.

From 2003-2004 Parkinson was the chairman of the Republican Trial Lawyers Caucus.

Significant cases

Ellis v R.J. Reynolds Tobacco Company

For purposes of this litigation Parkinson was to counsel Robinson, Calcagnie, and Robinson and Casey, Gerry, Reed, and Schenk. Critical California case against Big Tobacco in coordination with the national Castano Group.

Harold Poole, et al. v. Nippon steel, et al. 

Counseled individual cases and class action cases against Japanese corporations that used captured American soldiers as slave laborers in World War II.

References

1949 births
J. Reuben Clark Law School alumni
California lawyers
Living people
California Republicans